Public Security Division is a Division of the Ministry of Home Affairs in Bangladesh. It is responsible for public security and overseas the civilian security agencies of Bangladesh. Aminul Islam Khan is the current head of the Division and holds the rank of Senior Secretary.

History
Public Security Division is the part of the Ministry of Home Affairs which was established in 1971 by the Government of Bangladesh in exile during the Bangladesh Liberation war. In June 2016, the Government of Bangladesh divided the Ministry of Home Affairs into two Divisions, Public Security Division and the Security Service Division. The official gazette on the split was issued in 2017.

Agencies
Bangladesh Police
Border Guard Bangladesh
Bangladesh Coast Guard
Bangladesh Ansar
Village Defence Party
Investigation Agency-ICTBD
National Telecommunication Monitoring Centre

References

2016 establishments in Bangladesh
Organisations based in Dhaka
Government departments of Bangladesh